The 2022 Charlottesville Men's Pro Challenger was a professional tennis tournament played on indoor hard courts. It was the 13th edition of the tournament which was part of the 2022 ATP Challenger Tour, taking place in Charlottesville, United States from October 31 and November 6, 2022.

Singles main-draw entrants

Seeds

 1 Rankings are as of 24 October 2022.

Other entrants
The following players received wildcards into the singles main draw:
  Alafia Ayeni
  Iñaki Montes de la Torre
  Ethan Quinn

The following player received entry into the singles main draw as a special exempt:
  Tennys Sandgren

The following players received entry into the singles main draw as alternates:
  Aziz Dougaz
  Lucas Gerch

The following players received entry from the qualifying draw:
  Ulises Blanch
  Murphy Cassone
  Edan Leshem
  Aidan McHugh
  Nathan Ponwith
  Chris Rodesch

Champions

Singles

 Ben Shelton def.  Christopher Eubanks 7–6(7–4), 7–5.

Doubles

 Julian Cash /  Henry Patten def.  Alex Lawson /  Artem Sitak 6–2, 6–4.

References

2022 ATP Challenger Tour
2022
2022 in American tennis
2022 in sports in Virginia
October 2022 sports events in the United States
November 2022 sports events in the United States